is a 2003 Japanese pink film directed by Hideo Jōjō. It won the Bronze Prize at the 2003 Pink Grand Prix ceremony.

Cast
 Kaori: Machiko Michikawa
 Ruri Tachibana (橋瑠璃): Yoshiko
 Asami Sakura (佐倉麻美): Yumiko
 Katsumasa Shirato (白土勝功): Hitoshi Yunoki
 Ken'ichi Tajima (田嶋謙一): Haruki Michikawa
 Samon Sakeyama (サーモン鮭山): Mitsuo
 Daisuke Iijima (飯島大介): Doctor

Synopsis 
The film is in a surreal style. The story involves a young high school teacher who has retired for marriage and seduces one of her former students. She prolongs the relationship by seeing the student whenever her husband leaves for work. Eventually she hides the student in a bedroom closet for more convenient access.

Background 
Married Women Who Want a Taste was Hideo Jōjō's directorial debut, and he was given the Best New Director award at the Pink Grand Prix for his work. Lead actress Kaori had studied classical ballet in Paris. After returning to Japan she modeled and appeared in short films. Married Women Who Want a Taste was her debut role for Xces.

Critical appraisal 
Jasper Sharp calls Married Women Who Want a Taste an exceptional release from Xces, one of the critically lesser-regarded pink film studios. He writes that the chemistry between the two leads helps the film, which, he writes, is "an almost perfect pink film." The Japanese Pink film community also showed their approval of the film by awarding it the Bronze Prize and Best New Director at the Pink Grand Prix. Katsumasa Shirato was also awarded the Best Actor, 2nd place award for his performance.

Bibliography

References

External links
 IMDb entry

2003 films
2000s erotic films
2000s Japanese-language films
Pink films
2000s Japanese films